Jill Craybas and Marlene Weingärtner were the defending champions, but did not compete this year. Weingärtner would eventually retire from professional tennis at the 2005 US Open.

Laura Granville and Abigail Spears won the title, defeating Květa Peschke and María Emilia Salerni 3–6, 6–2, 6–4 in the final. It was the 1st title for Granville and the 3rd title for Spears, in their respective careers.

Seeds

Draw

Draw

External links
 Main and Qualifying draws

Doubles